Julián Güitrón Fuentevilla  is a Mexican lawyer and politician affiliated with the Convergence. As of 2014 he served as Senator of the LXI Legislature of the Mexican Congress  representing the Federal District.  He also works as educator in the Department of Law of the National Autonomous University of Mexico.

References

Date of birth unknown
Living people
Members of the Senate of the Republic (Mexico)
Citizens' Movement (Mexico) politicians
Academic staff of the National Autonomous University of Mexico
21st-century Mexican politicians
Year of birth missing (living people)